Dundas West is a subway station on Line 2 Bloor–Danforth of the Toronto subway in Toronto, Ontario, Canada. It is located just north of Bloor Street West at the corner of Dundas Street and Edna Avenue. The station is about 200 metres west of Bloor GO Station on the GO Transit Kitchener line and the Union Pearson Express.

The station, which is the north-western terminus of the 504A King and 505 Dundas streetcar routes, has two streetcar platforms and five bus bays to allow riders to transfer between connecting routes. Wi-Fi service is available at this station. A McDonald's restaurant serves the station, with access from both the fare-paid and non-fare-paid areas of the station's upper level, and there is a Gateway Newstand on the mezzanine level.

Overview

To the east of the station, the subway runs in a twin bored tunnel until just before the next station (Lansdowne). This allowed the tracks to pass underneath nearby railway lines without disturbing them during construction. To the west, the tracks follow a short "cut and cover" tunnel before emerging outside at the Dorval Portal. Trains run in open-air until they enter Keele Station.

South of the subway platforms, underground, are the four tunnels that comprise the Vincent Subway Yard. This station is also home to the Subway Track Maintenance Office, located on the Mezzanine level.

Nearby landmarks include The Crossways residential and retail complex, Bishop Marrocco/Thomas Merton Catholic Secondary School, The Lithuanian House banquet hall, Roncesvalles and The Junction neighbourhoods.

History

In 2002 as part of a scheduled reconstruction of the streetcar tracks on Dundas Street, a second streetcar track and platform was added in an effort to improve reliability on both the 504 King and 505 Dundas streetcar routes. Until the completion of the second track, a streetcar waiting in the station on either route could hold up vehicles on the other. At the same time, elevators were added, making the station wheelchair-accessible.

Following controversy over the namesake of Dundas StreetHenry Dundas, 1st Viscount Melville, who delayed the abolition of the transatlantic slave tradeToronto City Council voted in 2021 to rename Dundas Street and other civic assets named after Dundas, such as Dundas West station. A new name will be chosen in April 2022.

In April 2022, the streetcar loop was closed for two months to replace track and to extend the 505 streetcar platform to accommodate two Flexity Outlook streetcars.

Surface connections

TTC routes serving the station include:

Connection to Bloor GO station
Metrolinx plans to build a direct connection to Dundas West station to the nearby Bloor GO Station with a new pedestrian tunnel from the east end of the subway platforms. Provincial agency Metrolinx began proceedings to expropriate necessary properties for a pedestrian tunnel in September 2017. Metrolinx intended to start construction in 2018, but this was delayed when the ownership of The Crossways changed hands. Metrolinx expects property within The Crossways' parking garage necessary for tunnel construction to be transferred to Metrolinx in 2019.  this work was planned to start in early 2023.

References

External links
 

Line 2 Bloor–Danforth stations
Toronto streetcar loops
Railway stations in Canada opened in 1966